The Wife Between Us is a 2018 thriller novel written by Greer Hendricks and Sarah Pekkanen.

Plot
Vanessa is watching her ex husband's new fiancée. She lives with her aunt in New York City and is working at a clothing store to get by after her divorce from Richard. Nellie is Richard's new fiancée, a pre-school teacher. We learn that Vanessa and Nellie are the same person (Vanessa being her present self, and Nellie being her past self). It was Richard's idea to give Vanessa the nickname Nellie, because when they first met, she was a "nervous nellie."

Part two starts with what happened between Vanessa and Richard. Richard started gas-lighting and abusing Vanessa, cutting her off from friends and family. It becomes worse after they are unable to have children, which both believe is due to an abortion she had in college which she did not tell him about, partially due to the father being one of her professors, who was married. She starts seeing a therapist, who points out that Vanessa needs to leave. However, Vanessa knows Richard will not let her go and that he needs to decide to divorce her himself. She sets Richard up with his assistant, Emma, and the two begin an affair. Vanessa is finally free of her abusive marriage only to find out that Richard intends to marry Emma. To save her, Vanessa tells Emma Richard's reality but Emma does not believe her. Emma tells Richard, who confronts Vanessa. Vanessa tells Emma the first signs she saw of him controlling her. Emma then realizes she is being manipulated by Richard and agrees to leave him.

Vanessa visits Richard and threatens to reveal everything, provoking Richard into strangling her before Emma and Richard's sister, Maureen, intervene. Flash-forward, Richard is in a psych ward. Vanessa visits him only to find Maureen there; she seems to think there is something going on between the two. Vanessa tells her therapist she can finally move on. It is revealed that Vanessa's therapist is Richard's other ex wife, who he threw down a flight of stairs. It is also revealed that Emma is the daughter of the professor Vanessa had an affair with, and her parents' marriage ended after her mother found out. All three women are connected by their experiences.

Critical reception
The New York Times wrote "The novel is halfway over before the first reveal, but it’s worth the wait, if only for its singularity. Then the twists come fast and furious."

Film adaptation
In 2017 the film rights for The Wife Between Us were purchased by Steven Spielberg's Amblin Partners.

References

External links

2018 American novels
American thriller novels
English-language novels
American novels adapted into films